Frederick William John Hervey, 3rd Marquess of Bristol (28 June 1834 – 7 August 1907) was a British peer and Member of Parliament (MP).

Hervey was born in 1834 at Bristol House, Putney Heath, the son of Frederick Hervey, Lord Jermyn (later the 2nd Marquess of Bristol). He was educated at Eton and graduated from Trinity College, Cambridge in 1856. From 1859 until 1864, he was styled Lord Jermyn. On 4 March 1862, he married Geraldine Anson, a daughter of Maj.-Gen. Hon. George Anson, and they had two daughters.

Lord Bristol was a Conservative Member of Parliament (MP) for the Western division of Suffolk from 1859 until 1864, when he succeeded to his father's titles. From 1886 to 1907 he was Lord Lieutenant of Suffolk. He created the famous Pompeian Room at Ickworth, whose designs are based on Roman wall paintings uncovered in 1777 at the Villa Negroni on the Esquiline Hill in Rome.

Lord Bristol died in 1907, and as he had no sons, he was succeeded by his nephew, Frederick Hervey.

References

External links 
 

1834 births
1907 deaths
103
Lord-Lieutenants of Suffolk
Jermyn, Frederick Hervey, Lord
Jermyn, Frederick Hervey, Lord
Bristol, M3
Frederick Hervey, 3rd Marquess of Bristol
Conservative Party (UK) hereditary peers
People educated at Eton College
Alumni of Trinity College, Cambridge